Kalateh-ye Hajji Jahan Beyk (also Romanized as Kalāteh-ye Ḩājjī Jahān Beyk) is a village in Eshaqabad Rural District, Zeberkhan District, Nishapur County, Razavi Khorasan Province, Iran. At the 2006 census, its population was 199, in 57 families.

References 

Populated places in Nishapur County